Parliamentary elections were held in Finland on 1 and 2 April 1924. Although the Social Democratic Party remained the largest in Parliament with 60 of the 200 seats, Lauri Ingman of the National Coalition Party formed a centre-right majority government in May 1924. It remained intact until the Agrarians left in November 1924. Voter turnout was 57.4%.

Background
President Kaarlo Juho Ståhlberg decided to dissolve Parliament in January 1924 and to organise early elections for April 1924, as since August 1923, Parliament had been 27 members short following the arrest of the Communist MPs suspected of treason. Around December 1923 and January 1924, the Social Democrats threatened to withdraw from Parliament, unless early elections were held. Prime Minister Kyösti Kallio opposed the dissolution of Parliament, true to his parliamentary principles, and resigned after Ståhlberg indicated that he would dissolve Parliament. After Kallio's resignation, Ståhlberg appointed a caretaker government of civil servants, led by Professor Aimo Cajander (a Progressive). The 1922 land reform had been enacted, on the initiative of Prime Minister Kallio. The National Coalitioners were becoming more right-wing and less reformist. The Progressives were losing votes to the National Coalitioners and Agrarians, with their brand of petty-bourgeois, urban liberalism losing its appeal in the still heavily agrarian Finland.

Results

See also
List of members of the Parliament of Finland, 1924–1927

References

1924
Finland
Parliament
Finland
Election and referendum articles with incomplete results